Barrelhouse or Barrel House may refer to:

A "juke joint", a bar or saloon. Originates from the storage of barrels of alcohol. 
An early form of jazz with wild, improvised piano, and an accented two-beat rhythm (see Boogie-woogie)
Barrelhouse Records, a record label
The London Blues and Barrelhouse Club, a blues club in London founded by Alexis Korner and Cyril Davies
The Barrelhouse Club, a rhythm and blues nightclub in Los Angeles, co-owned by Johnny Otis
Barrelhouse Chuck (1958–2016), American Chicago blues musician
, a Dutch Blues band